Plasmodium pelaezi is a parasite of the genus Plasmodium subgenus Sauramoeba. As in all Plasmodium species P. pelaezi has both vertebrate and insect hosts. The vertebrate hosts for this parasite are lizards.

Description 
This species was first described by Malagón and Salmeron in 1988.

Distribution 
This species was described in lizards found at Chila de la Sal, Puebla, Mexico.

Hosts 
The only known host is the iguanid lizard Urosaurus bicarinatus bicarinatus.

References 

pelaezi